Razmian (also Romanized as Rāzmīān)  is a city and the capital of; Alamut-e Gharbi District, in Qazvin County, Qazvin Province, Iran. At the 2006 census its population was 965, in 284 families. People of Razmian are Tat and they speak Tati language.

Lambsar Castle

Lambsar Castle is one of the largest and the most fortified and unconquerable castles of the Ismailis (Assassin) in Iran, is about 5 km far from Razmian.

References 

Qazvin County
Cities in Qazvin Province